Manhunt is a World War II drama series consisting of 26 episodes, produced by London Weekend Television in 1969 and broadcast nationwide from January 1970.

Synopsis
British pilot Jimmy Briggs (Alfred Lynch) crashes his aeroplane in occupied France and immediately finds himself on the run from the Nazis.  He meets a young girl, Nina (Cyd Hayman), a part-Jewish agent with important information, and vows to get her back to Britain.  He is helped by another agent, code-named Vincent (Peter Barkworth), and pursued across France by S.S. Officer Lutzig (Philip Madoc), and the ambivalent Abwehr Sgt. Gratz (Robert Hardy), a complex psychological character who is implied to fall in love with Nina.  Unlike most previous war dramas, the Nazis were presented as more than just fanatical thugs.  While Lutzig was close to the stereotype, although given great depth by Philip Madoc, Gratz could not have been more different. Unlike many similar dramas, Manhunt also portrayed in detail the rivalry between the SS and the Abwehr.

Although the overall plot is driven by the need to keep Nina out of the hands of the Germans and return her to England with her secret information, the series ended in an anti-climax.  Gratz is sure that he has all of Nina's information anyway, mostly through pillow talk and carelessness on her part.  Nina and Jimmy, despite their closeness while on the run, live in different worlds in England.  Their relationship does not endure.

Cast

In addition, Manhunt features many notable guest appearances, such as by Paul Darrow, John Savident, George Sewell, Julian Glover, Nerys Hughes, Tony Beckley, and Richard Hurndall.

Notes

The Allied agents identify themselves to each other at one point with the challenge "What is war?" to which the answer is "War is love."
The musical theme was taken from Beethoven's Fifth Symphony, which features the famous rhythm used to introduce radio broadcasts to Nazi occupied territories, and also signifies the letter "V", for Victory, in Morse Code.
 With the exception of the episode "One More River" which was shot on film, the programme was shot on colour videotape.
 The episode "Intent To Steal" is most uncharacteristic of the series and features very little dialogue.
 The Gratz character appears to some extent to be modelled on Abwehr operative Hugo Bleicher, who was also an NCO and reputedly had a French Resistant as a mistress.

Episode list

See also
 Colditz, a 1972 television drama set during WW2, which also portrayed German characters in a more sympathetic way.

References

External links

ITV television dramas
World War II television drama series
1970 British television series endings
1970 British television series debuts
1970s British drama television series
London Weekend Television shows
English-language television shows